The 2003 Korean FA Cup, known as the 2003 Hana Bank FA Cup, was the eighth edition of the Korean FA Cup.

Qualifying rounds

Regional round

Group 1 
Group A of Seoul.

Group 2 
Group B of Seoul.

Group 3 
Group C of Seoul.

Group 4 
Group of southwest Gyeonggi.

Group 5 
Group of northern Gyeonggi.

Group 6 
Group of eastern Gyeonggi and Gangwon.

Group 7 
Group of Daejeon, Chungbuk and Jeonbuk.

Group 8 
Group of Busan and Gyeongnam.

Group 9 
Group of Daegu, Ulsan and Gyeongbuk.

Ranking of second-placed teams 
The supplementary round was contested between second-placed team in Group 9 and the seventh best team among the other eight second-placed teams.

Supplementary round 
Sinu Club advanced to the preliminary round.

Preliminary round

Amateur teams path

Universities path

Seed decision match 
Seoul City directly advanced to the round of 32, and Soongsil University qualified for the playoff round.

Playoff round

Final rounds

Bracket

Round of 32
Seoul City withdrew from the competition.

Round of 16

Querter-finals

Semi-finals

Final

See also
2003 in South Korean football
2003 K League
2003 K2 League

References

External links
Official website
Fixtures & Results at KFA

2003
2003 in South Korean football
2003 domestic association football cups